William Linn Westermann (September 15, 1873 – October 4, 1954) was an American historian and papyrologist who served as the president of the American Historical Association in 1944. He was regarded as an expert on the economy of the ancient world.

Career
Westermann was born in Belleville, Illinois, and attended the University of Nebraska and University of Berlin. He taught at the University of Missouri from 1902 to 1906, then left for the University of Minnesota. In 1908, Westermann joined the faculty of the University of Wisconsin. He spent twelve years of his academic career in Wisconsin, moving to Cornell University in 1920. He was appointed professor of ancient history at Columbia University on March 5, 1923. During his tenure at Columbia, Westermann acquired a large collection of Egyptian papyri for the institution. He retired in 1948 to become a visiting professor at the University of Alexandria in Egypt.

Westermann was appointed to the American Commission to Negotiate Peace and advised President Woodrow Wilson on Greek and Turkish events at the Paris Peace Conference of 1919. He was a member of the American Academy in Rome's Broad of Trustees from 1922 to 1933.

Personal life
Westermann, a descendant of William and Sharon Tyndale, died at White Plains Hospital in White Plains, New York on October 4, 1954. His wife, Avrina Davies Westermann, whom he married on June 15, 1912, died on December 21, 1960. They had one son, Evan Davies Westermann, (1914–1991) who attended the Scarsdale public schools, Phillips Exeter Academy, graduated from Harvard University, and worked for the New York Department of Commerce. He married Virginia Woodworth on August 4, 1942, and had two children.

References

External links
 
William Linn Westermann papers, ca. 1930–1954 at the Columbia University Library.
William Linn Westermann, Correspondence, 1918–1919 at the University of Nebraska-Lincoln Library
William Linn Westermann's presidential address and picture at the American Historical Association

1873 births
1954 deaths
People from Belleville, Illinois
20th-century American historians
American male non-fiction writers
Presidents of the American Historical Association
University of Nebraska–Lincoln alumni
University of Missouri faculty
University of Wisconsin–Madison faculty
Cornell University faculty
Columbia University faculty
University of Minnesota faculty
American papyrologists
American people of English descent
20th-century American male writers